"Willst du" is a song by German rapper Alligatoah from his third studio album Triebwerke (2013). The song was released in Germany as a digital download on 16 August 2013 and reached number 14 on the German Singles Chart and number 20 on the Austrian Singles Chart. The song's lyrics detail a couple, one of them asking the other if they want to take drugs together.

Track listing

Charts

Weekly charts

Year-end charts

Certifications

Release history

Robin Schulz version

German DJ and record producer Robin Schulz remixed the song, with the remix being released as a digital download on 22 August 2014 and reaching number 35 on the German Singles Chart.

Music video
A music video to accompany the release of "Willst du" was first released onto YouTube on 22 August 2014 at a total length of four minutes and thirteen seconds.

Track listing

Chart performance

Release history

References

2013 songs
2014 singles
Robin Schulz songs